Dean Rudland is a British DJ, compiler, and general manager of record company Acid Jazz Records.

Initially interested in 1960s soul music which he found via the early to mid-1980s mod revival scene, Rudland began DJing at a club nights before meeting Acid Jazz Records founder Eddie Piller. As well as assisting with the signing of artists on Acid Jazz, Rudland helped put together the label's popular compilation series "Totally Wired".

Whilst working for Acid Jazz Rudland met Tony Harlow, who worked for Blue Note Europe. The pair released a number of compilations which collectively became as "The Blue Series". Throughout his career he has relaunched EMI's Stateside label as well as working for Fania, and currently works for Ace Records as an A and R consultant, running their BGP label as well as continuing to work for Acid Jazz.

References

British DJs
British music industry executives
Living people
Year of birth missing (living people)